South Leicestershire is a constituency represented in the House of Commons of the UK Parliament since 2015  by Alberto Costa, a member of the Conservative Party.

The current constituency has similar boundaries to the previous Blaby constituency. Historically the "Southern Division of Leicestershire", was a county constituency, less formally known as South Leicestershire.  From 1832 to 1885 it elected two Members of Parliament (MPs) by the bloc vote system of election.

Boundaries

1832–1885: The Hundreds of Gartree (excluding the parishes of Baggrave, Burrough, Knossington, Marefield, Pickwell-cum-Leesthorpe, Ouston, and Newbold-Saucey), Sparkenhoe and Guthlaxton, and the Borough of Leicester and the Liberties thereof.

Boundaries from the 2010 general election
Following its review of parliamentary representation in Leicestershire, the Boundary Commission for England recommended replacing the Blaby constituency with a new South Leicestershire seat, with some boundary changes. This change occurred for the 2010 general election.

The electoral wards used to create the new constituency are;
Broughton Astley-Astley, Broughton Astley-Broughton, Broughton Astley-Primethorpe, Broughton Astley-Sutton, Dunton, Lutterworth Brookfield, Lutterworth Orchard, Lutterworth Springs, Lutterworth Swift, Misterton, Peatling, and Ullesthorpe in the Harborough District
Blaby South, Cosby with South Whetstone, Countesthorpe, Croft Hill, Enderby and St John's, Millfield, Narborough and Littlethorpe, Normanton, North Whetstone, Pastures, Ravenhurst and Fosse, Saxondale, Stanton and Flamville, and Winstanley in the Blaby District

Constituency profile
The current South Leicestershire is a slice of Leicestershire to the south west of Leicester, with most of the population in commuter towns and villages clustered close to Leicester itself, both in the suburb of Braunstone Town, including the large modern development of Thorpe Astley, and commuter villages like Whetstone, Blaby and Narborough. Further south it is more rural, with the largest settlement the old market town of Lutterworth. Nearby is the former site of RAF Bitteswell, since redeveloped as Magna Park, one of the largest distribution centres in Europe.

The constituency name of South Leicestershire was new for 2010, but the seat was not massively changed from the old seat of Blaby. Both this and its predecessor are safe Tory seats held by the party since Blaby's creation in 1974. The best known MP to represent the area is the former Chancellor Nigel Lawson.

History

1832-1885
The constituency was created by the Reform Act 1832 for the 1832 general election, when the two-seat Leicestershire constituency was replaced by the Northern and Southern divisions, each of which elected two MPs.

Both divisions of the county were abolished by the Redistribution of Seats Act 1885 for the 1885 general election, when they were replaced by four new single-seat constituencies: Bosworth, Harborough, Loughborough and Melton.

Prominent members in this period included Thomas Paget (Jnr) (1807–1892) who followed the footsteps of his father in this role (his father having represented Leicestershire) and as partner in Leicester Bank, and Albert Pell, a member of a group of MPs, which included Henry Chaplin, Sir Massey Lopes and Clare Sewell Read, who supported farming interests. He was also a member of the Council of the Royal Agricultural Society of England.

Members of Parliament

MPs 1832–1885

MPs since 2010

Elections

Elections in the 2010s

* Served as an MP in the 2005–2010 Parliament

Elections in the 1880s

Elections in the 1870s

 Caused by Curzon-Howe succeeding to the peerage, becoming Earl Howe.

Elections in the 1860s

 

 

 Caused by Packe's death.

Elections in the 1850s

Elections in the 1840s

Elections in the 1830s

 Caused by Turner's resignation

See also 
 List of parliamentary constituencies in Leicestershire and Rutland

Notes

References

Parliamentary constituencies in Leicestershire
Constituencies of the Parliament of the United Kingdom established in 1832
Constituencies of the Parliament of the United Kingdom disestablished in 1885
Constituencies of the Parliament of the United Kingdom established in 2010